Bombus cingulatus, the small tree bumblebee,  is a species of bumblebee found in Eurasia. Its appearance is similar to the tree bumblebee  Bombus hypnorum, but it is somewhat smaller, and generally establishes smaller nests. The small tree bumblebee can also be separated from the tree bumblebee by having darker hair forming a small band between the wing knots, which the tree bumblebee lacks.

References

Bumblebees
Insects described in 1854
Taxa named by Johan August Wahlberg